Sugar Creek is a stream in Hickman County, Tennessee, United States. It is a tributary of Duck River.

Sugar Creek was named for the sugar maple trees (Acer saccharum) growing along its banks.

See also
List of rivers of Tennessee

References

Rivers of Hickman County, Tennessee
Rivers of Tennessee